Jacaranda obtusifolia is a species of flowering plant in the family Bignoniaceae.

References

obtusifolia